Billie Simpson (born 7 July 1992) is a Northern Irish footballer who plays as a midfielder and has appeared for the Northern Ireland women's national team.

Career
Simpson played for the Cliftonville Ladies. One of her goals was nominated for the 2019 FIFA Puskás Award.

Simpson has been capped for the Northern Ireland national team, appearing for the team during the 2019 FIFA Women's World Cup qualifying cycle.

References

External links
 
 
 

1992 births
Living people
Women's association footballers from Northern Ireland
Northern Ireland women's international footballers
Women's association football midfielders
Forfar Farmington F.C. players